Dysgonia latifascia is a moth of the family Noctuidae first described by Warren in 1888. It is found in India.

References

Dysgonia